Francis Allard is a French academic, engineer and Distinguished Professor in Civil Engineering. Since February 2017, Allard is professor emeritus at La Rochelle University and Chairman of :fr:Tipee (Building Innovation Platform)> He has  expertise  in heat and mass transfer phenomena with application in energy efficiency and indoor environment in buildings and urban microclimate.

Publications

Books
Allard, Francis. Natural ventilation in buildings. A design handbook. (1998).   (Cited 796 times, according to Google Scholar  ) 
Allard F, Ghiaus C, editors. Natural ventilation in the urban environment: assessment and design. Routledge; 2012 Jun 25.(Cited 165 times, according to Google Scholar.)

Journal articles
Blondeau P, Iordache V, Poupard O, Genin D, Allard F. Relationship between outdoor and indoor air quality in eight French schools. Indoor air. 2005 Feb 1;15(1):2-12.(Cited 339 times, according to Google Scholar.)
Blondeau P, Spérandio M, Allard F. Night ventilation for building cooling in summer. Solar energy. 1997 Nov 1;61(5):327-35.   (Cited 209 times, according to Google Scholar.)  
Kurnitski J, Allard F, Braham D, Goeders G, Heiselberg P, Jagemar L, Kosonen R, Lebrun J, Mazzarella L, Railio J, Seppänen O. How to define nearly net zero energy buildings nZEB. Rehva Journal. 2011 May;48(3):6-12.  Cited 168 times   according to Google Scholar.)  
Ghiaus C, Allard F, Santamouris M, Georgakis C, Nicol F. Urban environment influence on natural ventilation potential. Building and environment. 2006 Apr 1;41(4):395-406. (Cited 140 times, according to Google Scholar.)

References 

Year of birth missing (living people)
Living people
Place of birth missing (living people)
French academics
French civil engineers